East Chambers High School, also abbreviated as  ECHS, is a public high school located in Winnie, Texas (USA). It is the sole high school in the East Chambers Independent School District. In 2015, the school was rated "Met Standard" by the Texas Education Agency.

Athletics
The East Chambers Buccaneers compete in the following sports:

Baseball
Basketball
Cross Country
Football
Golf
Powerlifting
Soccer
Softball
Tennis
Track and Field
Volleyball

References

External links
 Official website

Public high schools in Texas
Schools in Chambers County, Texas